Johannes Gerardus Hendrikus "Hans" Janmaat (3 November 1934 – 9 June 2002) was a Dutch businessman and politician of the Centre Party (CP) who later founded the Centre Democrats (CD).

Although he was widely known, he was never a major force in the Dutch political landscape, partly because of a cordon sanitaire imposed by Prime Minister Ruud Lubbers's third cabinet.

Biography

Early life
Johannes Gerardus Hendrikus Janmaat was born on 3 November 1934 in Nes aan de Amstel in North Holland, as the oldest of nine children in a traditional Roman Catholic family. His father was a salesman and insurance broker. When Janmaat was 4 years old, the family moved to Gouda, where it would endure the war years in relative peace.
After graduating in 1954, Janmaat started a study in aeronautical engineering, but had to drop out two years later after his father could no longer afford the tuition fees. Having to give up his studies to work was the first of many setbacks he would often refer to later in life.

In 1966 he married Belgian Evi Hock, having met her while working in Germany. In 1979, they divorced. In 1996, Janmaat married Wil Schuurman. No children were born in either marriage.

In the early 1960s, Janmaat ran a furniture factory with two of his brothers, but it burned down in 1966. He used the insurance payout to study politicology at the University of Amsterdam. Fellow-students found him ambitious, provocative and witty. In 1969, he participated in the occupation of the Maagdenhuis, the university's administrative center, as part of a student protest. He completed his studies in 1972.

Politics
After graduating, Janmaat held part-time positions as a teacher of civics. He also ran a one-man consultancy for small businesses.

In 1972, he joined the Catholic People's Party (KVP). He also worked in several commissions for the Democratic Socialists '70 (DS'70) party. Despite his efforts, he was not considered suitable for a front line position because of his capriciousness and tendency to go against the grain.

In the 1970s, he became more interested in the emerging issue of immigration as large numbers of foreign workers came to the Netherlands. His increasingly radical stance lead to a break with the KVP as well as DS'70.

In 1980, he read an article in Vrij Nederland which drew his attention to the recently founded extreme-right Centre Party (CP). After several interviews, he joined the party as its seventh member. Starting as a publicity worker, he would rapidly rise to be the party's top and was its lijsttrekker (top candidate) for the 1982 elections. The party won a single seat in the House of Representatives, which went to Janmaat. Other political parties largely ignored and ostracized him.

Centre Democrats
After disagreements and a power struggle with other members of the Centrum Party, he was expelled from the CP in October 1984. However, he retained his seat in parliament, in accordance with Dutch law. Janmaat officially launched his own party, the Centre Democrats (CD) in November 1984. Politically, the party did not differ greatly from the CP, except that it was strongly centered around Janmaat, to prevent another power struggle.

Several attempts were made to reconcile the differences between CP and CD. One such meeting in a hotel in Kedichem was disrupted by left-wing activists, who set fire to the building. Janmaat narrowly escaped with his life, CD secretary (and later wife of Janmaat) Wil Schuurman lost a leg because of injuries sustained jumping out of a window to escape the fire.

In the 1986 election, Janmaat lost his seat in parliament, however he regained his single seat in 1989.

His biggest political success would be in the 1994 elections, when he gained three seats. Major political parties changed their response to Janmaat and his views: rather than actively ignoring him they also started openly addressing the issue of immigration. In the 1998 election the CD lost all three of its seats. Janmaat had become increasingly paranoid and said that computers used for voting had been tampered with.

In 1999, Janmaat was in the process of starting another party, the Conservative Democrats, however it did not get off the ground and did not participate in the 2002 election.

His failing health forced him to withdraw from politics, however the changing political climate did prompt him to challenge his conviction for discrimination at the European Court of Justice. Janmaat's death in 2002 halted the case.

Political views
Janmaat wanted to represent the indigenous Dutch workers and middle class. His views were based mostly on economic and materialistic arguments rather than an underlying ideology. Disappointing economic growth, unemployment and government cutbacks could not be addressed while large numbers of immigrants were flowing into the country. Janmaat was against a multicultural society: he argued that immigrants should either assimilate into Dutch culture, or return to their country of birth.
His best known slogans were "Holland is not a country of immigration," "full=full" and "we will abolish the multicultural society, as soon as we get the chance and power"; he was convicted for the last two statements. According to Jan van de Beek, Hans Janmaat often used economic arguments in his tirades against immigrants.

He was often accused of committing acts of hate speech, and received fines and a conditional felony prison sentence for incitement to hatred and discrimination against foreigners.

He often made controversial remarks about immigrants and other politicians. He argued that Ernst Hirsch Ballin should not be allowed to hold a high office because of his Jewish heritage and said he was not saddened by the sudden death of political opponent Ien Dales.

Legacy
Other parties erected a cordon sanitaire around Janmaat, ignoring him while he spoke in parliament. A taboo on discussing negative aspects of immigration existed in the Dutch political climate in the 1980s.

Meindert Fennema, Emeritus Professor of Political Theory of Ethnic Relations at the University of Amsterdam, argued in 2006 that Janmaat was convicted for statements that are now commonplace due to changes in the political climate (caused in part by the September 11 attacks, and the assassinations of Pim Fortuyn and Theo van Gogh).

As the first public spokesperson who tried to put the topic of immigration on the Dutch political agenda, Janmaat has been mentioned as a forerunner of Pim Fortuyn, Geert Wilders and Thierry Baudet and their parties Leefbaar Nederland, Partij voor de Vrijheid and Forum voor Democratie, which booked greater electoral successes in the following decades.

References

External links

Official
  Drs. J.G.H. (Hans) Janmaat Parlement & Politiek

 

 

|-

|-

|-

1934 births
2002 deaths
Centre Democrats (Netherlands) politicians
Centre Party (Netherlands) politicians
Dutch expatriates in Germany
Dutch Roman Catholics
Dutch politicians convicted of crimes
Dutch political party founders
Leaders of political parties in the Netherlands
Independent politicians in the Netherlands
Members of the House of Representatives (Netherlands)
Party chairs of the Netherlands
People convicted of racial hatred offences
People from Amstelveen
People from Gouda, South Holland
Politicians from The Hague
University of Amsterdam alumni
20th-century Dutch businesspeople
20th-century Dutch educators
20th-century Dutch politicians